James Forsyth (18 October 1904 – 1982) was a Scottish football player, trainer and physiotherapist, who made more than 350 appearances in the Football League playing as a left half or inside left for Portsmouth, Gillingham and Millwall. Born in Armadale, West Lothian, he began his playing career in his native Scotland with Armadale and Bathgate, and finally retired from playing in 1943 to become assistant trainer of Millwall. He then became first-team trainer at Ipswich Town, a post he held for 15 years, and was caretaker manager of the club for a brief period in 1964, between the departure of Jackie Milburn and the arrival of Bill McGarry. He retired in 1971 and died in 1982.

Honours
Individual
 Ipswich Town Hall of Fame: Inducted 2012

References

1904 births
1982 deaths
Footballers from West Lothian
Scottish footballers
Association football wing halves
Bathgate F.C. players
Portsmouth F.C. players
Gillingham F.C. players
Millwall F.C. players
English Football League players
Scottish football managers
Ipswich Town F.C. managers
Date of death missing
Place of death missing
Armadale F.C. players
Association football inside forwards
People from Armadale, West Lothian